Littleton gunpowder works between Winford and Chew Magna in the English county of Somerset, started gunpowder production around 1650 and continued until approximately 1820. It is a listed as a scheduled monument.

The powder mill opened around 1740 following the expansion of the port in Bristol and increased availability of saltpetre from India. The mill was controlled by merchants based in the city and supplied gunpowder to ships sailing from the port. A previous warehouse, on the site where Bristol Temple Meads railway station now stands was considered too dangerous in the city. Despite a fire in 1755 the Littleton works expanded to become the largest gunpowder producing works in South West England by the middle of the 18th century. There was some association with another gunpowder mill at Woolley near Bath and the purchase and conversion of a snuff mill at nearby Stanton Drew was considered. It closed in the 1820s after the end of the Napoleonic Wars.

It was powered by an overshot water wheel on Winford Brook a tributary of the River Chew.

Some of the buildings remain intact, while others are ruined. The farmhouse was built in the mid 16th century but has been added to and revised in the 17th, 18th and 19th centuries. It is a Grade II* listed building, as is the 17th century barn. Powder Mill Cottage was built in the 18th century as the cooperage for the powder mill. The clock tower which was part of the works was originally attached to a chapel or office.

References

Grinding mills in the United Kingdom
Grade II* listed industrial buildings
Gunpowder mills
Grade II* listed buildings in North Somerset
Scheduled monuments in North Somerset